Gaano Kadalas ang Minsan (International title: Love Me Again/ ) is a 2008 Philippine television drama romance series broadcast by GMA Network. Based on a 1982 Philippine film of the same title, the series is the ninth instalment of Sine Novela. Directed by Gil Tejada Jr., it stars Marvin Agustin, Camille Prats and Diana Zubiri. It premiered on June 23, 2008 on the network's Dramarama sa Hapon line up. The series concluded on November 7, 2008 with a total of 100 episodes. It was replaced by Saan Darating ang Umaga? in its timeslot.

Cast and characters
Lead cast
 Marvin Agustin as Louis Antonio "Louie" Almeda
 Camille Prats as Lily Medrano/Cervantes
 Diana Zubiri as Elsa Cervantes-Almeda

Supporting cast
 Sandy Andolong as Gloria Cervantes
 Maybelyn dela Cruz as Charley Villanueva-Paterno
 Biboy Ramirez as Eric Paterno
 Victor Aliwalas as Thomas "Tommy" Romero
 Andrea del Rosario as Margarita Mendoza

Guest cast
 Ronnie Lazaro as Anselmo Perdigon
 Mark Gil as Emilio Cervantes
 Paulo Avelino as Kiko
 Ces Quesada as Pilar Medrano
 Julie Anne San Jose as Claudette Medrano
 Jesi Corcuera as Raquel "Rocky" Perdigon
 Mon Confiado as Fredo
 Jana Roxas as Kathleen
 Jan Marini-Pizzaras as Barbara
 Sweet Ramos as Dea Paterno
 Byron Ortile as Alvin
 Patricia Ysmael as Nina
 Dino Guevarra as Dodong
 Jen Rosendahl as Anya
 Krystal Reyes as Lara

Ratings
According to AGB Nielsen Philippines' Mega Manila household television ratings, the pilot episode of Gaano Kadalas ang Minsan earned a 19.8% rating. While the final episode scored a 22.9% rating.

References

External links
 

2008 Philippine television series debuts
2008 Philippine television series endings
Filipino-language television shows
GMA Network drama series
Live action television shows based on films
Philippine romance television series
Television shows set in the Philippines